Calendar is a personal calendar app made by Apple Inc. that runs on both the macOS desktop operating system and the iOS mobile operating system. It offers online cloud backup of calendars using Apple's iCloud service, or can synchronize with other calendar services, including Google Calendar and Microsoft Exchange Server.

The macOS version was known as iCal before the release of OS X Mountain Lion in July 2012. Originally released as a free download for Mac OS X v10.2 on September 10, 2002, it was bundled with the operating system as iCal 1.5 with the release of Mac OS X v10.3. iCal was the first calendar application for Mac OS X to offer support for multiple calendars and the ability to intermittently publish/subscribe to calendars on WebDAV servers. Version 2 of iCal was released as part of Mac OS X v10.4, Version 3 as part of Mac OS X v10.5, Version 4 as part of Mac OS X v10.6, Version 5 as part of Mac OS X v10.7, Version 6 as part of OS X v10.8, Version 7 as part of OS X v10.9, Version 8 as part of OS X v10.10 and OS X v10.11, and version 9 as part of macOS v10.12.

Apple licensed the iCal name from Brown Bear Software, who have used it for their iCal application since 1997.

iCal's initial development was quite different from other Apple software: it was designed independently by a small French team working "secretly" in Paris, led by Jean-Marie Hullot, a friend of Steve Jobs. iCal's development has since been transferred to Apple US headquarters in Cupertino.

Features
Calendar tracks events and appointments, allows multiple calendar views (such as calendars for "home", "work", and other calendars that a user can create) to quickly identify conflicts and free time.  Users can subscribe to other calendars so they can keep up with friends and colleagues, and other things such as athletic schedules and television programs, as well as set notifications for upcoming events either in the Notification Center, by email, SMS, or pager. Attachments and notes can be added to iCloud Calendar items.

It is integrated with iCloud, so calendars can be shared and synced with other devices, such as other Macs, iPhones, iPads, iPod touch, and PCs over the internet. One can also share calendars via the WebDAV protocol. Google now supports WebDAV for Google Calendar making Calendar easily configurable.

Calendar includes the ability to see travel time and weather at the event's location, with the ability to set an alarm based on the travel time Different time zones can be selected when entering and editing start and end times. This allows long-distance airplane flight times, for example, to be entered accurately and for that "end" of a visualized time "box" to render accurately on either iOS or macOS when time zone support is turned on in Calendar and the time zone set in Date/Time to the location in question.

See also
Calendar and Contacts Server
iCalendar
SyncML open standard for calendar syncing

References

External links
New Software Lets Users Manage Multiple Calendars & Share Calendars Over The Internet - Apple's July 2002 press release introducing iCal
New Application to Manage & Share Multiple Calendars Now Available for Free Download - Apple's September 2002 press release announcing availability of iCal
Calendar and Scheduling Consortium part of next version of iCal Server (Leopard)
iCal4j - iCal Java library (with usage examples)
Perl script and instructions  to subscribe from iCal to a Sun Calendar Server and subsequently sync it to mobile devices through iSync
Apple iCal calendars
Geody iCal and csv calendars - Free (CC-by-sa) calendars
iCalShare - Free calendars

Calendaring software
MacOS-only software made by Apple Inc.
IOS software
Calendar
WatchOS software
IOS